Petru Filip (born 23 January 1955 in Slobozia, Romania) is a Romanian politician, member of the Social Democratic Party (PSD). Since 2008, he has been a member of the Senate, representing Bihor County.

Biography

Filip served as mayor of Oradea (1992–1996, 2000–2007). He and his wife Valeria, a medical doctor, have one daughter.

Filip holds two PhD degrees, one in engineering, the second in public administration. For the latter of the two subjects, he is holding a chair at the "Agora" University in Oradea, as associate professor. Several years spent as an Expert of the Urban Institute in Washington add value to both his experience as a public official as well as his academic achievements in the field of Public Administration.

Elected as leader of the Bihor County chapter of the Democratic Party in 1998, he became  vice-president of the National Permanent Bureau (BPN) of the same party in 2005. On April 30, 2010, Filip resigned his position as chairman of the county party chapter.

He ended his third term as Mayor of Oradea shortly before time, after being helped into European politics by the comfortable score attained by his Democratic Party's national list at the polls on November 25, 2007.

Following a short career as MEP, Filip returned to national politics in Romania, in late fall 2008 he was elected Senator. He was assigned to the Committee for Public Administration, Territorial Planning and Environmental Protection, which he chaired until September 8, 2010, when he was elected Vice President of the Senate. He was a member of the Democratic Liberal Party (PDL) until April 2012 until his defection to the PSD.

See also
List of mayors of Oradea

Notes

References 
 Your MEPs: Petru Filip
 Filip Petru

External links 
 www.petrufilip.ro

Oradea
Mayors of places in Romania
Democratic Liberal Party (Romania) politicians
Social Democratic Party (Romania) politicians
People from Slobozia
1955 births
Living people
Democratic Liberal Party (Romania) MEPs
MEPs for Romania 2007–2009
Presidents of the Senate of Romania